Napialus  is a moth of the family Hepialidae. It is found in Hunan, China, from which its species epithet is derived.

References

Moths described in 1985
Hepialidae